The 2016 Jordan Super Cup was the 34th edition of the Jordan Super Cup. It was played on 29 July 2016 at Amman International Stadium in Amman, Jordan. The game was played between the 2015-16 league champion Al-Wehdat and the 2015–16 Cup winner Al-Ahli. Al-Ahli won 2-1.

Match

Details

See also

 2015–16 Jordan Premier League
 2015–16 Jordan FA Cup

References

2015–16 in Jordanian football
2016